Chapman State Park is a public recreation and historic preservation area bordering the Potomac River in Charles County, Maryland. The state park preserves the mansion and grounds of Mount Aventine, the historic home of the Chapman family, who had significant ties to many of the Founding Fathers. The park's diverse, heavily wooded biosphere is home to many rare and disjunct plant and animal species. Several of the park's trees have been nominated for state and national big tree champion status. Recreational features include fishing, hunting, and several miles of hiking trails.

References

External links

Chapman State Park Maryland Department of Natural Resources
Chapman State Park Map Maryland Department of Natural Resources
Friends of Chapman State Park

State parks of Maryland
Historic house museums in Maryland
Parks in Charles County, Maryland
Houses in Charles County, Maryland
Protected areas established in 1998
1998 establishments in Maryland